The following is a summary of United States presidential elections since 1828.

Notes

References

Lists of elections in the United States
United States presidential elections statistics